Challenging Times was a television quiz show for teams representing higher education institutes in Ireland, both those in the Republic of Ireland and those in Northern Ireland.  It was televised by Raidió Teilifís Éireann (RTÉ) from 1991 to 2001, sponsored by The Irish Times, and presented by Kevin Myers, then a columnist with that newspaper.  
The programme used a quizbowl format similar to that of University Challenge in the United Kingdom (the only difference is that the starter questions are worth five points, as opposed to ten on University Challenge), which is itself a licensed version of the College Bowl format popular in the United States. Each year, 16 teams qualified for the televised knockout stages, with two teams of three competing in each programme up to the final.

Production
Filming locations included RTÉ's Studio 1, the lecture theatre of St. Vincent's University Hospital and University College Dublin's O'Reilly Hall.

The programme was cancelled after the 2001 series, at a time when RTÉ was in financial difficulties.  
The final of that series was postponed at short notice and an episode of The Simpsons was broadcast instead.  
Kevin Myers later complained that RTÉ had given The Irish Times no notice that the series was being discontinued, 
though RTÉ disputed this contention.

Notable events
The 1997 final was notable for its controversial ending. DCU led 175 to UL's 170. Myers began to ask the final question: "He was born in Australia in 1902, of Irish parents..." The DCU captain buzzed in and answered "Ned Kelly" as the buzzer sounded to mark the end. An incorrect answer would mean a five-point penalty and a tie-break, but Myers ruled that the quiz had ended before the incorrect answer was given, and thus DCU won 175–170. (The controversial question actually referred to the writer Francis Stuart.)

Finals

Roll of honour

The Universities Act, 1997 substantially altered a number of third-level institutions, so this list unites the results of several colleges with their predecessors.

Other institutions that appeared on Challenging Times but did not reach a final:
Dún Laoghaire Institute of Art, Design and Technology
Galway-Mayo Institute of Technology
Garda Síochána College
Institute of Technology, Sligo (Sligo RTC)
King's Inns
Queen's University Belfast
Waterford Institute of Technology

References

External links
 RTÉ Stills Library (search for "Challenging Times")

1991 Irish television series debuts
2001 Irish television series endings
1990s Irish television series
Irish quiz shows
RTÉ original programming
Student quiz television series
The Irish Times
Universities and colleges in the Republic of Ireland